Sedar may refer to:

System for Electronic Document Analysis and Retrieval (SEDAR), Canadian document filing system for companies
Ed Sedar (born 1961), American baseball player

See also
Seder (disambiguation), associated with several Jewish holidays